Désiré Koranyi (28 January 1914 – 9 January 1981), a.k.a. Dezsõ Korányi or Dezsõ Kronenberger, was a Hungarian-French football player. He played club soccer most notably with FC Sète where he won the Division 1 in 1938-39. He was capped five times for France, scoring five goals.
He then enjoyed a coaching career with FC Sète and FC Metz.

He had two brothers who were also footballers: Lajos Korányi and Mátyás Korányi. Désiré played for FC Sète for 15 years and scored 174 goals in 196 games.

References

External links
 
 
 Profile at French federation official site 

1914 births
1981 deaths
French footballers
France international footballers
Hungarian emigrants to France
Naturalized citizens of France
FC Sète 34 players
AC Arlésien players
Montpellier HSC players
Ligue 1 players
Ligue 2 players
French football managers
AC Arlésien managers
FC Metz managers
FC Sète 34 managers
ESA Brive players
Association football forwards